Budy may refer to:

a village near Brzeszcze, Oświęcim County in Lesser Poland Voivodeship, or the eponymous subcamp of Auschwitz concentration camp formerly located there
Budy, Gmina Bobrowo in Kuyavian-Pomeranian Voivodeship (north-central Poland)
Budy, Grudziądz County in Kuyavian-Pomeranian Voivodeship (north-central Poland)
Budy, Mogilno County in Kuyavian-Pomeranian Voivodeship (north-central Poland)
Budy, Białystok County in Podlaskie Voivodeship (north-east Poland)
Budy, Grajewo County in Podlaskie Voivodeship (north-east Poland)
Budy, Mońki County in Podlaskie Voivodeship (north-east Poland)
Budy, Łódź Voivodeship (central Poland)
Budy, Końskie County in Świętokrzyskie Voivodeship (south-central Poland)
Budy, Staszów County in Świętokrzyskie Voivodeship (south-central Poland)
Budy, Kozienice County in Masovian Voivodeship (east-central Poland)
Budy, Płock County in Masovian Voivodeship (east-central Poland)
Budy, Siedlce County in Masovian Voivodeship (east-central Poland)
Budy, Konin County in Greater Poland Voivodeship (west-central Poland)
Budy, Krotoszyn County in Greater Poland Voivodeship (west-central Poland)
Budy, Złotów County in Greater Poland Voivodeship (west-central Poland)
Budy, Bytów County in Pomeranian Voivodeship (north Poland)
Budy, Słupsk County in Pomeranian Voivodeship (north Poland)
Budy, Starogard County in Pomeranian Voivodeship (north Poland)
Budy, Warmian-Masurian Voivodeship (north Poland)
Budy, Russia, a village in the Republic of Mordovia, Russia
Budy, Ukraine, an urban-type settlement in Kharkiv Oblast, Ukraine
 Avangard Budy, a bandy club based in Budy, Ukraine